Several shootings at schools in Montreal, Canada have been dubbed the Montreal shooting or Montreal massacre:
The École Polytechnique massacre in 1989
The Concordia University massacre in 1992
The Dawson College shooting in 2006

Another shooting occurred at the Métropolis in Montreal when Pauline Marois was announced Prime Minister of Quebec in 2012:
2012 Montreal shooting